Haploditha is a genus of pseudoscorpions in the family Tridenchthoniidae. There is at least one described species in Haploditha, H. chamberlinorum.

References

Further reading

External links

 

Tridenchthoniidae
Pseudoscorpion genera